The family of Lyndon B. Johnson is an American political family related to Lyndon B. Johnson, the 36th president of the United States (1963–1969), and his wife Lady Bird Johnson, the second lady of the United States (1961–1963) and the first lady of the United States (1963–1969). Their immediate family was the First Family of the United States from 1963 to 1969.

Immediate family 
The immediate family of Lyndon B, Johnson consists of his wife and their two daughters. The couple and their two daughters all shared the initials LBJ.

Wife 
Claudia Alta "Lady Bird" Johnson (née Taylor) was born on December 22, 1912, in Karnack, Texas, and died on July 11, 2007. She was an American socialite and first lady of the United States. She was married to Lyndon B. Johnson from 1934 until his death in 1973.

She was well-educated for a woman of her era and was a capable manager and a successful investor. As first lady, she was an advocate for beautifying the nation's cities and highways, and the Highway Beautification Act came to be informally known as "Lady Bird's Bill". She received the Presidential Medal of Freedom in 1977, and the Congressional Gold Medal in 1988, the highest honor bestowed upon a US civilian.

Daughters

Lynda Bird Johnson 
Lynda Bird Johnson Robb (née Johnson) was born on March 19, 1944, in Washington, D.C. She is the elder of the two daughters of Lyndon B. Johnson. She served as chairwoman of the Board of Reading is Fundamental (RIF), the nation's largest children's literacy organization, as well as chairwoman of the President's Advisory Committee for Women.

In 1967, she married Chuck Robb, who later served as the Governor of Virginia. She is the oldest living child of a US President, following the death of John Eisenhower on December 21, 2013.

Luci Johnson 
Luci Baines Turpin (née Johnson) was born on July 2, 1947, in Washington, D.C. She is the younger of the two daughters of Lyndon B. Johnson. Her name was originally spelled "Lucy", but she changed the spelling in her teens as a rebellion against her parents.

Since 1993, she has been the chairman of the board and manager of LBJ Asset Management Partners, a family office, as well as chairman of the board of BusinesSuites. She is on the board of directors of the LBJ Foundation and has served on multiple civic boards raising funds for The Lady Bird Johnson Wildflower Center and the American Heart Association.

Ancestry 
The earliest known ancestor of Lyndon B. Johnson dates back to 1795. Most of his relatives were born and raised in Texas, but his paternal grandfather was born in Wedowee, Alabama.

Parents

Samuel Ealy Johnson Jr 
Samuel Ealy Johnson Jr. was born on October 11, 1877. He was an American businessman and politician, who was a Democratic member of the Texas House of Representatives representing the 89th District. He served in the 29th, 30th, 35th, 37th, and 38th Texas Legislatures.

Rebekah Baines Johnson 
Rebekah Baines Johnson was born on June 26, 1881. She married Samuel Ealy Johnson Jr. on August 20, 1907. They had five children, Lyndon B. Johnson being the eldest. She died on September 12, 1958.

Grandparents

Samuel Ealy Johnson Sr. 
Samuel Ealy Johnson Sr. was born on November 12, 1838, in Wedowee, Alabama. He was the paternal grandfather of Lyndon B. Johnson and was the tenth child of Lucy Webb (Barnett) and Jess Johnson. He was raised a Baptist, but he later became a member of the Christian Church. He was present at the Battle of Galveston and at the Battle of Pleasant Hill in Louisiana. He died on February 25, 1915.

Eliza Bunton 
Eliza Bunton was born on June 24, 1849, in Caldwell County. She married Samuel Ealy Johnson Sr. on December 11, 1867, and had a son. She died on January 30, 1917.

Genealogical table 
The following is a genealogical table of ancestors of Lyndon B. Johnson.

Sources and references

External links 

 LBJ Foundation and Presidential library - http://www.lbjlibrary.org/lyndon-baines-johnson/lbj-biography/

 
First Families of the United States